Ella Baff was the Senior Program Officer for Arts and Cultural Heritage at the Andrew W. Mellon Foundation in New York City until 2018.

Previously, Baff was the Executive and Artistic Director of Jacob’s Pillow, a 225-acre historic site that encompasses an international dance festival, professional school, archives, exhibits, artist residencies, public venues, and education and community programs. Under her leadership, the organization was designated a National Historic Landmark and was awarded the National Medal of Arts from President Barack Obama at the White House.

Prior to Jacob's Pillow, Baff was the Program Director of Cal Performances, an international presenting organization at the University of California, Berkeley.

As a certified Literacy Instructor through the Public Library System, she taught children and adults to read.

Baff received several awards in the cultural field including the Chevalier of the Order of Arts and Letters from the Ministry of Culture of France and the Dawson Award for Programmatic Excellence from the Association of Performing Arts Professionals. She has received Honorary Doctorates from the Massachusetts College of Liberal Arts and the College of the Holy Cross.

Baff has been a moderator for the Works & Process series at the Guggenheim Museum. She has served on the board of directors of the International Society for the Performing Arts (ISPA) and MASS MoCA (Massachusetts Museum of Contemporary Art). She is a member of the Advisory Council of the American Friends of the Batsheva Cultural Center in Tel Aviv, designed by Sir David Adjaye, opening in 2023.

References

Dance in the United States
Living people
Year of birth missing (living people)
Chevaliers of the Ordre des Arts et des Lettres